Mihla is a village and a former municipality in the Wartburgkreis district of Thuringia, Germany. Since December 2019, it has been part of the town Amt Creuzburg.

History
Within the German Empire (1871-1918), Mihla was part of the Grand Duchy of Saxe-Weimar-Eisenach.

References

Wartburgkreis
Former municipalities in Thuringia